The Lincoln Z, previously known as the Lincoln Zephyr, is a Chinese mid-size luxury sedan produced since 2022 by Changan Ford, a joint venture between Chinese automaker Changan Automobile and American automaker Ford Motor Company, and sold by Lincoln Motor Company, a subsidiary of Ford.

Overview

On April 21, 2021 at Auto Shanghai, Lincoln revealed the Zephyr Reflection Concept, which previewed an upcoming China-built vehicle designed to replace both the discontinued North American Lincoln MKZ and Lincoln Continental that were previously imported to Chinese market. The production Chinese Lincoln Zephyr was revealed on November 19, 2021 at Auto Guangzhou.

The Lincoln Zephyr went on sale in China as the Lincoln Z in March 2022.

Specifications
The Z uses an 8-speed automatic transmission and is front-wheel drive.

References

Zephyr (China)
Cars introduced in 2021
Cars of China
Sedans
Front-wheel-drive vehicles

External links
 Official website (China)